Song Ju-hee (or  ; born October 30, 1977) is a retired South Korean football player and coach who is currently coaching Jeonbuk KSPO.

Honours

Team 
Korea Republic
 AFC Women's Asian Cup 3rd Place: 1995, 2003
 EAFF Women's Football Championship: 2005

Individual 
 KFA Best Player Award: 2004

References

1977 births
Living people
South Korean women's footballers
WK League players
South Korea women's international footballers
Women's association football forwards
Women's association football defenders
Incheon Hyundai Steel Red Angels WFC players
2003 FIFA Women's World Cup players